Ling-Yue Hung (born 10 November 1964) is a Hong Kong curler. She has competed at the 2016 Pacific-Asia Curling Championships where she finished with a 2-5 record, and the 2017 Pacific-Asia Curling Championships where she finished in fourth place with a 3-7 record.  In 2018 she competed at the 2018 Pacific-Asia Curling Championships where she finished 4th and advanced to the 2019 World Qualification Event.  At the 2019 Pacific-Asia Curling Championships she again finished 4th and qualified to advance to the 2020 World Qualification Event but the team decided not to attend.  She competed in the 2017, 2018 and 2019 World Mixed Curling Championships and the 2018 and 2019 World Mixed Doubles Curling Championships.

Teams

References

External links

1964 births
Living people
Hong Kong female curlers
21st-century Hong Kong women